James Bliska is an American molecular biologist, focusing on molecular mechanisms that underlie pathogenesis or host protection during host-microbe cell interactions, currently at Geisel School of Medicine and was Elected as Fellow at the American Association for the Advancement of Science in 2013.

References

Fellows of the American Association for the Advancement of Science
American molecular biologists
Living people
Year of birth missing (living people)
Fellows of the American Academy of Microbiology